Egvekinot (Chukchi: , Èrvyḳynnot, lit. sharp, hard land) is an urban locality (an urban-type settlement) and the administrative center of Iultinsky District in Chukotka Autonomous Okrug, Russia.

Geography

History
Archeological excavations around the settlement have indicated that the area was inhabited in Neolithic times and possibly even in the Mesolithic, with the discovery of a number of stone implements, tools for grinding and obsidian arrowheads, all of which are now stored in the local museum in Egvekinot.

In 1937, metal deposits were discovered in Iultin. Due to the isolated nature of the area, the transportation of any minerals extracted would be difficult and it was decided that a new port would be created to serve the Iultin mines. Dalstroy formed a new section, "Chukotstroy", whose aim was to construct Egvekinot and the road connecting it with the Iultin mines.

On July 16, 1946, the MV Sovetskaya Latviya brought the first 1,500 settlers to Egvekinot. These construction workers were mainly political prisoners rather than willing emigrants. This labor force was responsible for the construction of the entire infrastructure in the area, including the construction of Egvekinot, the nearby village of Ozyorny, and the village of Iultin, as well as the  road linking the mines to the new port, the power station, warehouses, and residential and industrial buildings.

As a result of this, the settlement became quite an important hub causing the population to grow to over 5,000 by the late 1980s. However, when the mining complex was closed in 1993, the economy of Egvekinot suffered with the population falling rapidly throughout the 1990s, although the 2010 Census details indicate a slight recovery in recent years.

Administrative and municipal status

Within the framework of administrative divisions, Egvekinot serves as the administrative center of Iultinsky District, to which it is directly subordinated. As a municipal division, the urban-type settlement of Egvekinot is incorporated within Iultinsky Municipal District as Egvekinot Urban Settlement.

The nearby former selo of Ozyorny has been incorporated into Egvekinot as Ozyorny Microdistrict.

Transportation
Infrequent helicopter service to Provideniya by Chukotavia.

Egvekinot is linked to the now abandoned settlement of Iultin by the 
(around ) via Amguema, as well as to the abandoned settlements of Dorozhny, Tranzitny, and Geologichesky. The road crosses the Amguema River.

Demographics

Culture and sights

A monument to the MI-8 helicopter, a common sight in the air over Chukotka, is located in the airport.

There is a museum in the settlement which deals mainly with local history, people, and archeology, as well as a cultural center, home to the Zalivskiye Napevy folk chorus, the Sone song group, and Severyanka folk dance ensemble.

Egvekinot has one of only two ski slopes in Chukotka; a ski lodge can be found near the Staratelsky Stream.

Climate
Egvekinot has a subarctic climate (Köppen Dfc) falling just short of a tundra climate (Köppen ET). Temperatures average below freezing from October all the way through to the following May, and can average below  from December through to March. The short summer is temperate. Temperatures over  can occur during the brief summer, especially in July. On 10 July, 2019 the temperature reached for the first and only time , with the record high being .

See also
List of inhabited localities in Iultinsky District

References

Notes

Sources

Petit Fute, Chukotka

External links
Pictures of Egvekinot on Panoramio
Egvekinot photo gallery

Urban-type settlements in Chukotka Autonomous Okrug
Populated places established in 1946
1946 establishments in the Soviet Union
Road-inaccessible communities of Russia